Homogyna sanguipennis is a moth of the family Sesiidae. It is most commonly found in Southern Africa.

References

Sesiidae
Moths of Africa
Moths described in 1926